Victoria Park railway station served the area around Victoria Park in east Belfast.

History
The station was opened by the Belfast and County Down Railway on 1 May 1905. It saw little use during its lifetime, and by the time it was closed by Northern Ireland Railways in 1988, few trains were stopping.

Victoria Park itself is still accessible by rail from the nearby Sydenham station.

Service

See also
List of parks and gardens in Belfast

References

Disused railway stations in County Down
Disused railway stations in Belfast
Railway stations opened in 1905
Railway stations closed in 1988
1905 establishments in Ireland
1988 disestablishments in Northern Ireland
Railway stations in Northern Ireland opened in the 20th century